Lee So-dam (born 12 October 1994) is a South Korean footballer who plays as a midfielder for the South Korea national team. She most recently played club football for NJ/NY Gotham FC in the National Women's Soccer League (NWSL).

Club career
Lee joined Incheon Hyundai Steel Red Angels before the start of the 2018 season.

Lee joined Sky Blue FC on 5 January 2021 on a one-year contract with an option for a second year. The club rebranded to NJ/NY Gotham FC during her tenure. On 4 December 2021, the club declined to exercise Lee's contract offer, releasing her.

International goals
Scores and results list South Korea's goal tally first.

Honours
 Asian Games Bronze medal: 2014

References

External links

1994 births
Living people
South Korean women's footballers
Women's association football midfielders
South Korea women's under-17 international footballers
South Korea women's under-20 international footballers
South Korea women's international footballers
2015 FIFA Women's World Cup players
WK League players
Asian Games medalists in football
Footballers at the 2014 Asian Games
Asian Games bronze medalists for South Korea
Medalists at the 2014 Asian Games
Incheon Hyundai Steel Red Angels WFC players
2019 FIFA Women's World Cup players
NJ/NY Gotham FC players
National Women's Soccer League players